Taraqi Tork (also Romanized as Ţarāqī Tork; also known as Tarāqān) is a village in Baba Aman Rural District, in the Central District of Bojnord County, North Khorasan Province, Iran. At the 2006 census, its population was 939, in 203 families.

References 

Populated places in Bojnord County